Wilhelm Eipeldauer (26 April 1885 – 7 October 1949) was an Austrian footballer. He played in four matches for the Austria national football team from 1902 to 1908.

References

External links
 

1885 births
1949 deaths
Austrian footballers
Austria international footballers
Place of birth missing
Association football defenders
First Vienna FC